Astrid Plank (born 30 June 1971) is an Italian former alpine skier who competed in the 1992 Winter Olympics.

World Cup results
Top 10

External links
 
 

1971 births
Living people
Italian female alpine skiers
Olympic alpine skiers of Italy
Alpine skiers at the 1992 Winter Olympics
Sportspeople from Sterzing
Germanophone Italian people